The 1977 Indian general election in Jammu and Kashmir to the 6th Lok Sabha were held for 6 seats. Jammu and Kashmir National Conference won 2 seats, Indian National Congress won 2 seats and an independent candidate Parvati Devi of Ladakh constituency won 1 seat.

Constituency Details

Results

Party-wise Results

List of Elected MPs

See also 

 Elections in Jammu and Kashmir

References 

1977
1977
Jammu